Diocese of Peterborough  may refer to:

 Anglican Diocese of Peterborough, in England
 Roman Catholic Diocese of Peterborough, in Ontario, Canada

See also
 Roman Catholic Diocese of East Anglia, covering Peterborough, England